The Banque de l'Afrique Occidentale (BAO, "Bank of West Africa") was a French bank established in 1901 to issue currency for the colonies of French West Africa.

Colonial history
BAO was originally created by the expansion of the Banque du Sénégal (itself created by the French on 21 December 1853). BAO later expanded to include French Equatorial Africa to administer the common currency of French West Africa. Although it was a private investment bank, the French government authorized it to print currency, and its board always included colonial officials. It received special concessions and financial stabilisation from the government, and in essence became an arm of the French colonial administration. Between 1941 and 1958, the Institut d'Emission de l'Afrique Occidentale Francaise et du Togo was spun off from BAO to administer the Franc des colonies françaises d'Afrique (FCFA) (25 December 1945).Global Financial Data

Economic role in colonial structure
Historians like Henri Brunschwig have pointed to the importance of the BOA in the assimilation of French West Africa into the French economic system.  Its founding in 1901 came after the extension of limited taxation of subjects, forced labor laws, and voting in the colonial possessions (notably the communes of Dakar and Saint-Louis, Senegal).  The creation of and government support for the BOA was part of an attempt to inject investment into the French colonies.  In 1880, almost all French economic interests in the area were in the form of family-run trading houses based in French port cities like Bordeaux and Marseilles. The creation of the BOA coincided with the consolidation of these trading houses into joint stock companies, the ending of formal government concessions to these houses, and the rise of a de facto monopoly of their successors. Émile Maurel (CEO of Maurel et Prom) and Henri Nouvion (managing director of Banque du Sénégal) were respectively the first president and managing director of the newly created BOA. By the 1920s, business in the AOF was dominated by just three private joint stock companies: the Compagnie Française de l'Afrique Occidentale, the Nouvelle Société Commerciale africaine, and the Société Commerciale de l'Ouest Africain (lagging slightly were the growing plantation and mining interests of the Unilever company). The BAO's board largely overlapped with the boards of these trading companies.  When the initial privileges granted to the BOA expired in 1929, the French government granted it a further forty-year concession, with the only stipulation being that the government reserved the right to nominate the BOA's chair, and four members of its board.

While the Banque de France in Paris remained essentially a bank for banks, the BAO was a bank of issue and a commercial, deposit, and broking bank. In 1904 it was given the right to acquire shares in commercial companies, as long as investment did not exceed a quarter of its reserves.

In consolidating banking institutions in semi-public hands, France hoped to foster greater inward capital investment into the AOF and created an opening for private banking interests to operate on the ground in the colonies.  Most notably, the interwar years saw the founding of the Banque nationale pour le commerce et l'industrie (BNCI), which would merge in 1966 with the Comptoir National d'Escompte de Paris (CNEP) to form Banque Nationale de Paris, and in 1924, the Banque Comerciale de 1'Afrique (BCA).

In 1924, BAO expended to French Equatorial Africa buy opening branch in Brazzaville.  It followed this by opening branches in Port Gentil (1928), Libreville (1930), Pointe Noire (1936), Bangui (1946), and Fort Lamy (1950).

The strategy of using BAO to foster inward investment was something of a failure though.  Capital extraction, not capital investment was the source of French wealth in West Africa. Taxes and import/export duties coming from the African colonies to the Metropole accounted for most of the capital movement in the AOF. Tremendous legal concessions were made to the BOA, and while it dominated the banking sector, its capital remained minuscule in comparison to companies engaged in capital extraction from the AOF.  The BOA held capital of 6 million francs before 1914, and that rose to 50 million in 1931, but declined thereafter.  In 1940 all banks in the AOF had a total investment of just over 1.5 million francs.  But forestry alone had an inward investment of almost 3.4 million francs that year.

The economic crisis of the early 1930s saw the collapse of the major private banks in the AOF, and the French authorised the BAO to save the BNCI by becoming its largest shareholder.  At this point, the BOA regained its status as the sole investment bank in French West Africa.

Social role in colonial structure
Banking institutions, public and private, enabled colonial businesses to pull more of the West African economy into a moneyed economy and expand the replacement of traditional agriculture with large scale cash crops for export.  This was most evident in the tremendous growth of groundnut plantations.

Offices of the BAO were built in major towns throughout French West Africa, and their imposing edifices became symbols of French colonial power.

Independence
Following independence, the BAO was rechartered as the central bank for the francophone countries of West Africa.  On 22 November 1962, the bank was renamed the Banque des Etats de l'Afrique Centrale (BEAC) and the CFA Franc was renamed the Franc de la Coopération Financière en Afrique Centrale (The CFA franc).

Its last French President and Director General, Georges Gautier and Claude Panouillot, stepped down in 1962.

See also
 Banque de l'Algérie
 State Bank of Morocco
 Banque de Madagascar 
 Bank of British West Africa
 West African CFA franc
 West African Economic and Monetary Union
 Banque Centrale des États de l'Afrique de l'Ouest

References
 
 (French) centrale des États de l'Afrique de l'Ouest
 (French) History on the BEAC Werbsite 
 (French) French Central Bank: Qu'est ce que la Zone franc?
 (French)  Modalités financières de la colonisation from fr.wikipedia.org
 Gary Wilder: The French Imperial Nation-state: Negritude and Colonial Humanism Between the Two World Wars. University of Chicago Press (2005). 

Former central banks
Banks of Senegal
Economy of Benin
Economy of Burkina Faso
Economy of Ivory Coast
Economy of Guinea-Bissau
Economy of Mali
Economy of Niger
Economy of Senegal
Economy of Togo
French West Africa
20th century in Senegal
20th century in Mauritania
20th century in Benin
20th century in Mali
20th century in Burkina Faso
20th century in Niger
20th century in Guinea
20th century in Ivory Coast
Banks established in 1901
Economic history of Africa
French colonial empire
1901 establishments in French West Africa